Scott Galyon is a former NFL linebacker who grew up in Seymour, TN where he played football, basketball and baseball at Seymour High School. He signed a football scholarship to play linebacker for the University of Tennessee during his senior year.

Galyon played four years at the University of Tennessee where he led the team in tackles during his junior and senior years and was voted Team Captain during his senior season. Galyon was then drafted by the New York Giants and played for seven years in the NFL, four with the Giants and three with the Miami Dolphins. He then moved back to Tennessee in 2003 and worked as a volunteer coach with his high school team, the Seymour Eagles, before eventually working with Novartis Pharmaceuticals for three years.  He joined the FCA staff from December 2007 – 2017.

Galyon is the former head football coach at Seymour High School. He is married to Chasity, who is also from Seymour, TN.

1974 births
Living people
American football linebackers
New York Giants players
Miami Dolphins players
Tennessee Volunteers football players
Players of American football from Tennessee
People from Sevier County, Tennessee
Ed Block Courage Award recipients